Zeta Pegasi or ζ Pegasi, formally named Homam, is a single star in the northern constellation of Pegasus. With an apparent visual magnitude of +3.4, this star is bright enough to be seen with the naked eye and is one of the brighter members of Pegasus.

Nomenclature
ζ Pegasi (Latinised to Zeta Pegasi) is the star's Bayer designation.

It bore the traditional name Homam, meaning "Man of High Spirit" or "Lucky Star of High Minded". In 2016, the International Astronomical Union organized a Working Group on Star Names (WGSN) to catalogue and standardize proper names for stars. The WGSN approved the name Homam for this star on 21 August 2016 and it is now so entered in the IAU Catalog of Star Names.

Properties

This star has a stellar classification of B8 V, which identifies it as a large B-type main sequence star that is generating energy through the nuclear fusion of hydrogen at its core. The radius of this star is about four times that of the Sun. It is a slowly pulsating B star that varies slightly in luminosity with a period of  hours, completing 1.04566 cycles per day.

Zeta Pegasi has been examined for infrared excess that may indicate the presence of circumstellar matter, but none was found. This star does have two optical companions. The first is a magnitude 11.6 star at an angular separation of  along a position angle of 139°, as of 1997. Zeta Pegasi is not known to be a member of a stellar association.

References

B-type main-sequence stars
Slowly pulsating B stars

Pegasus (constellation)
Pegasi, Zeta
Durchmusterung objects
Pegasi, 42
214923
112029
8634
Homam